Gezhouba is a dam on the Yangtze River, in Yichang, Hubei, China.

Gezhouba may also refer to:
Gezhouba Group, Chinese construction and engineering company
Gezhouba International Plaza, skyscraper in Wuhan, Hubei, China